Kleodora Peak is a  mountain summit located in the Athabasca River valley of Jasper National Park, in the Canadian Rockies of Alberta, Canada. It is situated at the head of Fryatt Creek  Valley on the same high ridge as Mount Christie, Brussels Peak, Mount Lowell, Xerxes Peak, and Karpathos Peak (Mount Olympus). Its nearest higher peak is Parnassus Peak,  to the north. The mountain was named for Kleodora,  who in  Greek mythology lived on Mount Parnassus. The name has not been officially adopted yet for this peak. An unnamed glacier lies below the eastern slope in the cirque between Kleodora Peak and Mount Belanger. 


Climate

Based on the Köppen climate classification, Kleodora Peak  is located in a subarctic climate with long, cold, snowy winters, and short mild summers. Temperatures can drop below -20 °C with wind chill factors below -30 °C. Precipitation runoff from Kleodora Peak drains into tributaries of the Athabasca River.

See also
Geography of Alberta
Geology of the Rocky Mountains

References

External links
Parks Canada web site: Jasper National Park

Two-thousanders of Alberta
Mountains of Jasper National Park
Canadian Rockies
Alberta's Rockies